Donald E. "Crutch" Carothers (May 13, 1934 – September 19, 2008) was an American football offensive end who played one season with the Denver Broncos of the American Football League (AFL). He was drafted by the Chicago Cardinals in the tenth round of the 1957 NFL Draft. He played college football at Bradley University and attended Moline High School in Moline, Illinois.

Early years
Carothers participated in high school football, basketball and track for the Moline High School Maroons. He was a member of the 1951 Maroons basketball team that finished second in the state. He also won the Illinois state high jump title for three consecutive years.

College career
Carothers first attended the University of Iowa on a basketball scholarship. He transferred to Bradley University and was a letterman in football, basketball and track for the Braves. He was a member of the Braves basketball team that won the 1957 NIT championship. Carothers was also the team's leading receiver and punter in football his senior season. He was later inducted into the Bradley University Athletic Hall of Fame.

Professional career
Carothers was selected by the Chicago Cardinals of the National Football League (NFL) with the 118th pick in the 1957 NFL Draft. He signed with the Cardinals on June 3, 1958, after his senior year at Bradley. He was released by the Cardinals on September 15, 1958. Carothers signed with the AFL's Denver Broncos in 1960 and played in three games for the team during the 1960 season.

Personal life
Carothers worked as an insurance agent and also in the investment field after his football career. He was later the owner of the Carothers Insurance Company in Bettendorf, Iowa. He also was the general manager of the Quad City Raiders, which played in the Continental Football League.

References

External links
Just Sports Stats

2008 deaths
1934 births
Players of American football from Illinois
American football ends
Iowa Hawkeyes men's basketball players
Bradley Braves football players
Bradley Braves men's basketball players
American male track and field athletes
College men's track and field athletes in the United States
Chicago Cardinals players
Denver Broncos (AFL) players
20th-century American businesspeople
American businesspeople in insurance
Insurance agents
Businesspeople from Illinois
People from Moline, Illinois
American men's basketball players